The Apple A12X Bionic is a 64-bit system on a chip (SoC) designed by Apple Inc. It first appeared in the iPad Pro (3rd generation), announced on October 30, 2018. The A12X is an 8-core variant of the A12 (four big cores, four small cores) and Apple states that it has 35 percent faster single-core CPU performance and 90 percent faster overall CPU performance than its predecessor, the Apple A10X. The Apple A12Z Bionic is an updated version of the A12X, adding an additional GPU core, and was unveiled on March 18, 2020 as part of the iPad Pro (4th generation).

Design 
The A12X and A12Z feature an Apple-designed 64-bit ARMv8.3-A octa-core CPU, with four high-performance cores called Vortex and four energy-efficient cores called Tempest. The Vortex cores are a 7-wide decode out-of-order superscalar design, while the Tempest cores are a 3-wide decode out-of-order superscalar design. The Tempest cores are based on Apple's Swift cores from the Apple A6, and are similar in performance to ARM Cortex-A73 CPU cores. It is Apple's first SoC with an octa core CPU.

The A12X integrates an Apple-designed 7-core graphics processing unit (GPU), with twice the graphics performance of the A10X. The A12Z has an 8-core GPU, one more core than the A12X, enabling better performance in 4K video editing, rendering, and augmented reality. Embedded in the A12X and A12Z is the M12 motion coprocessor. The A12Z additionally features tuned performance controllers and a better thermal architecture compared to the A12X, which potentially allows for higher clock speeds. The A12X and A12Z include dedicated neural network hardware that Apple calls a "next-generation Neural Engine". This neural network hardware, which is the same as found in the A12, can perform up to 5 trillion operations per second.

The A12X and A12Z are manufactured by TSMC using a 7 nm FinFET process, and it contains 10 billion transistors vs. the 6.9 billion on the A12. The A12X is paired with 4 GB of LPDDR4X memory in the third-generation 12.9" iPad Pro and the first-generation 11" iPad Pro, or 6 GB in the 1 TB storage configurations. The A12Z is paired with 6 GB of LPDDR4X RAM in the fourth-generation 12.9" iPad Pro and the second-generation 11" iPad Pro.

The A12X has video codec encoding support for HEVC and H.264. It has decoding support for HEVC, H.264, MPEG‑4, and Motion JPEG.

Developer Transition Kit (2020) 
At its 2020 Worldwide Developer's Conference, Apple introduced the Developer Transition Kit (2020), which uses the A12Z processor with 16 GB RAM in a Mac mini enclosure, hence being the first Macintosh computer to use the Apple silicon architecture.

The A12Z would be used as the basis for the design of the M1, Apple's first in-house processor designed for use in Mac computers. In an interview shortly after the introduction of the DTK (2020), Apple’s SVP of Software Engineering Craig Federighi commented:

“Even that DTK hardware, which is running on an existing iPad chip that we don’t intend to put in a Mac in the future – it’s just there for the transition – the Mac runs awfully nice on that system. It’s not a basis on which to judge future Macs ... but it gives you a sense of what our silicon team can do when they’re not even trying – and they’re going to be trying.”

Products that include the Apple A12X and A12Z Bionic

A12X Bionic 
 iPad Pro 11-inch (1st generation)
 iPad Pro 12.9-inch (3rd generation)

A12Z Bionic 
 iPad Pro 11-inch (2nd generation)
 iPad Pro 12.9-inch (4th generation)
 Developer Transition Kit (ARM, 2020)

See also 
 Apple silicon, the range of ARM-based processors designed by Apple.
 Apple A12

References 

Computer-related introductions in 2018
Apple silicon